This was the first edition of the tennis tournament.

Tennys Sandgren won the title after defeating Nikola Milojević 4–6, 6–0, 6–3 in the final.

Seeds

Draw

Finals

Top half

Bottom half

References
Main Draw
Qualifying Draw

Tempe Challenger - Singles